Tracey Lee Wickham  (born 24 November 1962 in Rosebud, Victoria) is an Australian former middle distance swimmer. Wickham was the World Champion for the 400 m and 800 m freestyle in 1978, and won gold in both events at the 1978 and 1982 Commonwealth Games. She is a former world record holder for the 400 m, 800 m and 1500 m freestyle. Despite her success in the pool, Wickham has battled hardship and personal tragedy throughout her life.

Swimming career
Wickham began swimming at the age of eight at John Rigby's pool in Brisbane and mastered her technique under the guidance of Peter Diamond. At the age of thirteen, she was selected to be on the Australian team for the 1976 Montreal Olympic Games but failed to reach the finals at that meet.

In 1977, Wickham's family moved to California, where she trained for six months with coaching legend Mark Schubert. She returned to Brisbane at the end of 1977 and she came under the guidance of coach Bill Sweetenham at the Commercial Swimming Club. On 8 February 1978, Wickham broke her first world record, the 1500 m freestyle, in a solo swim at the Fortitude Valley Pool in Brisbane, clocking 16:14.93.

At the 1978 Commonwealth Games in Edmonton, Alberta, Canada, Wickham won both the 400 m and 800 m freestyle. That same year, she set world records in both events, and won both the 400 m and 800 m freestyle at the 1978 Berlin World Championships, setting a world 400 m record of 4.06.28, which stood as the Championship record until 2007. Both world records stood until 1987, long after her retirement.

In 1980, Australia decided against an official boycott of the 1980 Summer Olympics. A number of Australian athletes elected to boycott the Games personally. Wickham maintains that she withdrew from the team because of illness, as she was suffering glandular fever at the time, not because of the boycott. The 800 m freestyle was won by fellow Australian Michelle Ford at that meet.

Wickham retired at the end of 1979 due to financial problems. The policy of amateurism was upheld by the Amateur Swimming Union of Australia during this period, meaning Wickham could neither earn money from the sport nor receive any prizes.
Wickham returned to swimming in the early 1980s under coach Laurie Lawrence. She won gold in the 400 m and 800 m freestyle at the 1982 Commonwealth Games, where she took the Athletes Oath at the Opening Ceremony. Her gold medal for the 400 m was presented to her by Queen Elizabeth II and Wickham retired from swimming immediately afterwards.
Following the birth of her daughter, Wickham dived back into the water in May 1990, again with Lawrence as her coach, that year completing the 7.6 km open water race from Magnetic Island to Townsville, placing first in the female division. She also won the female division of the Lake Trasimeno 20 km marathon race. She retired for good following the birth of her son in January 1992.

Personal life 
She was educated at the All Hallows' School, in Brisbane along with her sisters Julie and Kelly. Wickham married in 1986 and had two children, Daniel and Hannah. She divorced her husband in the mid-1990s.

Her daughter, Hannah, died at the age of nineteen from synovial sarcoma on 2 October 2007. Wickham is an ambassador for Hannah's Chance Foundation, which supports teenage cancer victims.

Honours and awards
On 30 December 1978, Wickham was made a Member of the Order of the British Empire.

On 10 December 1985, she was inducted into the Sport Australia Hall of Fame, and was inducted into the International Swimming Hall of Fame at Fort Lauderdale in 1992.

On 25 October 2000, she was awarded the Australian Sports Medal for outstanding contribution as a competitor in swimming.

On 13 June 2005, she was awarded the Medal of the Order of Australia for service to Australian swimming and to the development of young swimmers through teaching and coaching roles.

Swimming achievements
1976 Montreal Olympic Games
Team member
1978 Edmonton Commonwealth Games
400 metres freestyle - gold medal
800 metres freestyle - gold medal
200 metres freestyle - silver medal
4 x 100-metre medley relay (butterfly leg) - silver medal
4 x 100-metre freestyle relay - bronze medal
1978 Berlin World Championships
400 metres freestyle - gold medal
800 metres freestyle - gold medal
1982 Brisbane Commonwealth Games
400 metres freestyle - gold medal
800 metres freestyle - gold medal
200 metres freestyle - silver medal
1990 Magnetic Island to Townsville Swim
First place
1990 Italian Gran Fondo Marathon Lake Swim
First place

Book
 Tracey Wickham's biography Treading Water: My Life in And Out of the Pool by Peter Meares was published by Random House Australia October 2010.

See also
 List of members of the International Swimming Hall of Fame
 Commonwealth Games records in swimming
 List of World Aquatics Championships medalists in swimming (women)
 List of Commonwealth Games medallists in swimming (women)
 World record progression 400 metres freestyle
 World record progression 800 metres freestyle
 World record progression 1500 metres freestyle

References

External links
 

1962 births
Living people
Commonwealth Games gold medallists for Australia
Australian Members of the Order of the British Empire
Recipients of the Medal of the Order of Australia
Swimmers at the 1978 Commonwealth Games
Swimmers at the 1982 Commonwealth Games
World record setters in swimming
World Aquatics Championships medalists in swimming
Australian female freestyle swimmers
Swimmers at the 1976 Summer Olympics
Olympic swimmers of Australia
Commonwealth Games silver medallists for Australia
Commonwealth Games bronze medallists for Australia
Commonwealth Games medallists in swimming
People educated at All Hallows' School
Sport Australia Hall of Fame inductees
20th-century Australian women
Medallists at the 1978 Commonwealth Games
Medallists at the 1982 Commonwealth Games